Below is an alphabetical list of notable artists who were born and/or worked in Belarus.



A
Michał Elwiro Andriolli (1836–1893)
Meer Akselrod (1902–1970), painter
Zair Azgur (1908–1995), sculptor

B
Vitold Byalynitsky-Birulya (1872–1957)
Peter Blume (1906–1992), painter and sculptor
Abraham Bogdanove (1888–1946)

C
Marc Chagall (1887–1985)
Jacques Chapiro (1887–1972)
Natalia Chernogolova (born 1954)

D
Jonas Damelis (1780–1840), painter
Mai Dantsig (1930–2017)
Elena Drobychevskaja (b. 1968), graphic artist
Dovgyallo Mikhail Hrisanfovich (1908-1978) painting (The best painter of his time)
Dovgyallo Oleg Mikhailovich (1940-2000) painting

E
Aleksandra Ekster (1882–1949)

G
 Leon Gaspard (1882–1964)
 Giovanni Battista Gisleni (1600–1672)

K
Morris Kantor (1896–1974)
Anatoli Lvovich Kaplan (1902–1980), painter, sculptor and printmaker
Kandrat Karsalin (1809–c.1883), portrait painter
Pavel Kastusik (b. 1976)
Michel Kikoine (1892–1968), painter
Katarzyna Kobro (1898–1951)
Irina Kotova (b. 1976) 
Pinchus Kremegne (1890–1981)
Victor Kopach (b. 1970)
Dmitry Kustanovich (b. 1970), amateur artist

L
Jacques Lipchitz (1891–1973)
El Lissitzky (1890–1941)

P
Yehuda Pen (1854–1937)
Antoine Pevsner (1886–1962)

R
Alexandr Rodin (b. 1947), contemporary painter
Alfred Isidore Romer (1832–1897), painter, sculptor, carver and medalist
Ferdynand Ruszczyc (1878–1936)

S
Mikhail Savitsky (1922–2010)
William S. Schwartz (1896–1977)
Yauhen Shatokhin (1947–2012), painter
Simon Segal (1898–1969)
Lasar Segall (1891–1957)
Francysk Skaryna (1490–1552)
Joseph Solman (1909–2008)
Chaïm Soutine (1893–1943)
Wladyslaw Strzeminski (1893–1953)

V
Sergey Voychenko (1955–2004), poster artist

Z
Boris Zaborov (1935–2021)
Ossip Zadkine (1890–1967) 
Sergey Zaryanko (1818–1871), portrait painter
Ilia Zdanevich (1894–1974)
Stanislav Zhukovsky (1873–1944)

External links
Art Bank of Belarus 

Belarusian culture
 
Artists
Belarusian